Karaimeendarkottai is a village in the Orathanadu taluk of Thanjavur district, Tamil Nadu, India.

Demographics 

As per the 2001 census, Karaimeendarkottai had a total population of 1212 with 597 males and 615 females. The sex ratio was 1.030. The literacy rate was 69.39.

References 

 

Villages in Thanjavur district